El Trabuco Venezolano – Vol. II  is a vinyl LP by Venezuelan musician Alberto Naranjo, originally released in 1979 and partially reedited in two CD albums titled El Trabuco Venezolano 1977 – 1984 Vol. 1 (1994) and Vol. 2 (1995). It is the second of seven albums (two live albums) of the El Trabuco Venezolano musical project arranged and directed by Naranjo.

Track listing

Personnel
 Alberto Naranjo – drums, arranger, director on all tracks;tympani on 1, Colombian percussion on 3
 Eduardo Cabrera – acoustic piano on 1
 Lucio Caminiti – piano on 2 (electric), 4 (acoustic)
 José Ortiz – acoustic piano on 3, 5, 6
 José Velásquez – bass guitar on 1, 2, 4, 5
 Carlos Acosta bass guitar on 3
 Lorenzo Barriendos bass guitar on 6
 Frank Hernández – timbales on 1, 5, 6
 Felipe Rengifo – congas on all tracks
 Jesús Quintero – bongos on all tracks
 Luis Arias – trumpet (lead) on all tracks except on 4 and 5
 José Díaz F. – trumpet on 1, flugel horn on 2, 3, 6
 Alfredo Gil – trumpet on 1, 3, lead on 5, flugel on 2
 Luis Lewis Vargas – trumpet on 1, 5, 6
 Rafael Velázquez – trumpet on 2, 5, flugel on 3
 Manolo Pérez – trumpet on 6
 Rodrigo Barboza – trombone on 1, 2, 3, 6
 Leopoldo Escalante – trombone on 1, 5, 6
 Rafael Silva – trombone on 2, 5; Wagner tuba on 3
 Héctor Hurtado – trombone on 1
 José Plaza – trombone on 2, 3
 Angelo Pagliuca – trombone on 5, 6
 Carlos Daniel Palacios – lead singer on 1 and chorus
 Carlín Rodríguez – lead singer on 2 and chorus
 Moisés Daubeterre – lead singer on 3 and chorus
 Ricardo Quintero – lead singer on 5 and chorus
 Joe Ruiz – lead singer on 6 and chorus

Guest musicians 
 Sonero Clásico del Caribe on Introduction
Pedro Aranda – acoustic guitarJosé Castro – bassCarlos Landaeta – claveEvaristo León – bongosJohnny Pérez – maracasJosé R. Soto – 1st voiceSantiago Tovar – 2nd voice and Cuban tresCarlos Guerra (Sr) - trumpet
Alfredo (Chocolate) Armenteros – trumpet on Introduction
 Rolando Briceño – tenor sax on 2, 3, 6
 Leo Quintero – guitar on 2 (acoustic), 6 (electric)
 Cruz M. Arraiz – baritone sax on 3, 6
 Alvaro Serrano – Colombian percussion on 3
 Ezequiel Serrano – Colombian percussion on 3
 Rosalba Chiquiar – female choir on 3
 Otilia Rodríguez – female choir on 3
 Vladimir Lozano – lead vocalist on 4
 Manuel Freire – soprano, alto, tenor and baritone saxes;C flute, G flute, clarinet and bass clarinet (all dubbed) on 4
Strings section on 4
Violins: Alberto Flamini (concertmaster), Carmelo Russo, Sigfrido Chiva, Grigorije Girovski,Bogdan Biegniewski, Inocente Carreño, Sigfrido Chiva, Boris Jivkov, Alejandro Ramírez
Violas: Francisco Molo, José Olmedo
Cellos: Lauren Levenson, Bodgan Trochanowski
Harp: Alba Quintanilla

Technical personnel 
 Artistic director: Domingo Alvarez
 Associate producer: César Miguel Rondón
 Executive producer: Orlando Montiel
 Musical director: Alberto Naranjo
 Staff coordinator: Freddy Sanz
 Cover design: Alvaro Sotillo
 Photos: Fernando Sánchez
 Label:YVKCT con músiC.A. YVL-005
 Print: Editorial Arte
 Place of Recording: Estudios Sono Dos Mil
 Recording engineer: Ricardo Landaeta – Alejandro Cornejo (assistant)
 Mastering: Robert C. Ludwig (Masterdisk, New York)
 Produced in Caracas, Venezuela, 1979

External links
Anapapaya.com
Salsa2u.com
Venciclopedia.com - El Trabuco Venezolano Vol. II
YouTube.com

1979 albums
Alberto Naranjo albums